London High School is a public high school located in an unincorporated area south of Corpus Christi, Texas, United States and classified as a 3A school by the UIL. It is a part of the London Independent School District located in south central Nueces County. The district added high school grades in 2011 after being a K-8 district for years. In 2015, the school was rated "Met Standard" by the Texas Education Agency.

Athletics
The London Pirates compete in these sports 

Soccer
Baseball
Basketball
Cross Country
Football
Golf
Softball
Tennis
Track and Field
Volleyball

State Titles
Baseball
2022(3A)

References

External links
 
 London ISD website

High schools in Corpus Christi, Texas
Public high schools in Texas
Schools in Nueces County, Texas
2011 establishments in Texas